Bellevue railway station can mean:
 Bellevue railway station, Perth
 Berlin Bellevue station

See also
 Belle Vue railway station Manchester
 Belle Vue Halt Isle of Man